Fall of the Mohicans (/ Uncas, The End of a Race, or ) is a 1965 Spanish-Italian historical western adventure film directed by Mateo Cano and starring Jack Taylor, Paul Muller and Sara Lezana. The film is based on James Fenimore Cooper's 1826 novel The Last of the Mohicans, but made in the style of a Spaghetti Western. It was shot on location in the Tabernas Desert of Almería Another adaptation of the story The Last Tomahawk was released the same year by Germany's Constantin Film.

Story
In 1757 French troops take Fort William Henry. British Colonel Munro and his two daughters are captured by the Marques of Montcalm and offered to the Huron chief Cunning Fox.

Cast
 Jack Taylor as Duncan Edward
 Paul Muller as Colonel Munro
 Sara Lezana as Cora Munro
 Daniel Martín as Uncas
 José Manuel Martín as Cunning Fox
 Barbara Loy as Alice Munro
 Luis Induni as Hawkeye
 José Marco as Chingachgook
 Carlos Casaravilla as Tamerind
 Rufino Inglés as Doctor 
 Modesto Blanch as Brancourt 
 Pedro Rodríguez de Quevedo as General Webb
 Alfonso del Real as Higgins 
 José Riesgo as Soldier 
 Lorenzo Robledo as Commander 
 Pedro Fenollar as French Officer 
 Pastor Serrador as Marquis de Montcalm
 Carlos Casaravilla as Tamenund

References

Bibliography
 Bertil O. Österberg. Colonial America on Film and Television: A Filmography. McFarland, 15 Apr 2009.

External links
 

1965 films
Films based on The Last of the Mohicans
1960s Italian-language films
Spaghetti Western films
1965 Western (genre) films
1960s historical adventure films
Italian historical adventure films
Spanish historical adventure films
Films set in 1757
Films directed by Mateo Cano
Films shot in Almería
1960s Italian films
Italian-language Spanish films